Rakhimov is a surname, derived from the Arabic male given name Rahim. Notable people with the surname include:

Baxtiyor Rahimov (born  1963), rebel leader in Uzbekistan who advocates an Islamic republic
Murtaza Rakhimov (born 1935), President of the Republic of Bashkortostan, Russia
Rashid Rakhimov (born 1965), Tajikistani football coach and former footballer
Gafur Rakhimov (born 1951), businessman and alleged crime lord
Sobir Rakhimov (or Sabir Rakhimov), Uzbek general and hero of USSR during World War II

Surnames of Uzbekistani origin
Azerbaijani-language surnames
Kazakh-language surnames
Kyrgyz-language surnames
Russian-language surnames
Tajik-language surnames
Turkmen-language surnames
Uzbek-language surnames
Patronymic surnames
Surnames from given names